Cantharellula is a genus of mushroom-forming fungi in the family Hygrophoraceae. The genus was described by mycologist Rolf Singer in 1936.

Species

See also
List of Agaricales genera

References

Agaricales genera
Hygrophoraceae
Taxa named by Rolf Singer